Enrique José Sánchez León (born 16 July 1972) is a Mexican former professional boxer and the former WBA super bantamweight champion.

Professional career
In 1990, Sánchez won pro debut by stopping veteran Felipe Castillo in the fourth round.

NABF Super Bantamweight Championship
In March 1997 Enrique defeated American Joe Manzano to win the NABF Super Bantamweight title in a twelve round fight.

WBA Super Bantamweight Championship
On February 8, 1998 Sánchez won the vacant WBA Super Bantamweight title by upsetting Puerto Rican, former World Boxing Organization world's champion Rafael del Valle over twelve rounds. He would lose his title to fellow Mexican Néstor Garza. All three of his losses were to World Champions Marco Antonio Barrera, Robert Guerrero, and Néstor Garza.

See also
List of Mexican boxing world champions

References

External links

Boxers from Mexico City
World boxing champions
World Boxing Association champions
World super-bantamweight boxing champions
Super-bantamweight boxers
1972 births
Living people
Mexican male boxers